Emsley A. Laney High School is a public high school in Wilmington, North Carolina, United States. The school was named after Emsley Armfield Laney, a business and community leader for several decades in Wilmington. It is a part of New Hanover County Schools. The school was attended by Michael Jordan whose biography on the official NBA website states: "By acclamation, Michael Jordan is the greatest basketball player of all time."

Notable alumni 
Kadeem Allen (born 1993), basketball player for Hapoel Haifa in the Israeli Basketball Premier League
 Dondi E. Costin (born 1964), former major general in the United States Air Force
 Jeff Ferrell (born 1990), former MLB pitcher
 Kitwana Jones (born 1981), former linebacker in the Canadian Football League
 Michael Jordan (born 1963), former professional basketball player
 Leroy Smith (born 1963), former professional basketball player
 Lara Trump (born 1982), former television producer and campaign adviser to her father-in-law Donald Trump
 Kevin Whitted, former basketball player and coach
 Tamera Young (born 1986), former WNBA player

References

External links 
 

Public high schools in North Carolina
Schools in Wilmington, North Carolina